Arthur John Thomas (21 September 1884 – 7 May 1960) was an Australian rules footballer who played with St Kilda in the Victorian Football League (VFL).

After arriving from Brunswick in 1910, Thomas played 17 games in his debut season and kicked 15 goals, which were enough to top the goal-kicker. A rover, he appeared in three further seasons for St Kilda. His brother, Hugh Thomas, coached St Kilda in the 1940s.

References

1884 births
Australian rules footballers from Victoria (Australia)
St Kilda Football Club players
Brunswick Football Club players
1960 deaths